Methuen Publishing Ltd is an English publishing house. It was founded in 1889 by Sir Algernon Methuen (1856–1924) and began publishing in London in 1892. Initially Methuen mainly published non-fiction academic works, eventually diversifying to encourage female authors and later translated works.  E. V. Lucas headed the firm from 1924 to 1938.

Establishment
In June 1889, as a sideline to teaching, Algernon Methuen began to publish and market his own textbooks under the label Methuen & Co. The company's first success came in 1892 with the publication of Rudyard Kipling's Barrack-Room Ballads. Rapid growth came with works by Marie Corelli, Hilaire Belloc, Robert Louis Stevenson, and Oscar Wilde (De Profundis, 1905) as well as Edgar Rice Burroughs’ Tarzan of the Apes.

In 1910 the business was converted into a limited liability company with E. V. Lucas and G.E. Webster joining the founder on the board of directors. The company published the 1920 English translation of Albert Einstein’s Relativity, the Special and the General Theory: A Popular Exposition.

With knowledge he had gained of children's literature at the publisher Grant Richards, E. V. Lucas built on the company's early success. Among the authors Lucas signed to the company were A. A. Milne, Kenneth Grahame, while he also supported illustrators W. Heath Robinson, H. M. Bateman and E. H. Shepard. By the 1920s it had also a literary list that included Anthony Hope, G. K. Chesterton, Henry James, D. H. Lawrence, T. S. Eliot, Ruth Manning-Sanders and The Arden Shakespeare series.

The Rainbow
Following the publication of Lawrence's The Rainbow (1915), the  British Director of Public prosecuted Methuen for obscenity.  The firm offered no defence and agreed to destroy the remaining stock of 1,011 copies. It is thought that one reason for the firm’s failure to support Lawrence was that he had at the time written an unkind portrait of the chief editor’s brother, who had recently been killed in France.

Edward Verrall Lucas
In 1924 E. V. Lucas succeeded Algernon Methuen as chairman and led the company until his death in 1938.  Besides his executive role he also received a separate salary as the chief reader of the company.  His commercial judgment added authors Enid Blyton, P. G. Wodehouse, Pearl S. Buck and Maurice Maeterlinck to the company’s list. In 1935 they published Daniele Varè's novel The Maker of Heavenly Trousers.

In 1930 the company published the popular humorous book 1066 and All That.

Tintin
Methuen was the English publisher of the book editions of The Adventures of Tintin, a series of classic Belgian comic-strip books, written and illustrated by Hergé. Methuen altered their editions of Tintin by insisting that books featuring British characters undergo major changes. The Black Island, first published in French in 1937, was set in Great Britain, but, prior to publishing it themselves in 1966, Methuen decided that it did not reflect the U.K. accurately enough and sent a list of 131 "errors" to be corrected. It was thus redrawn and reset in the 1960s. Critics have attacked Methuen over the changes, claiming that Black Island lost a lot of its charm as a result. 
Land of Black Gold had had a troubled publishing history, but the completed adventure eventually appeared in 1948–50. It was set in the British Mandate of Palestine and featured the conflict between Jews, Arabs and British troops. When Methuen was translating the Adventures of Tintin into English, Israel had long since been in existence, and Methuen asked for it to be edited. Hergé took the opportunity to redraw the few problematic pages, as well as the pages before that: the freighter that appeared before that was based on Hergé's imagination, due to lack of resources at the time. The earlier version, published in 1950, was reprinted by Casterman as a facsimile edition, but internationally was completely replaced by the newer version.

Recent history
In 1958 Methuen was part of the conglomerate Associated Book Publishers (ABP), and for much of the 1970s was known as Eyre Methuen following its absorption of the Eyre & Spottiswoode firm. When ABP was acquired by the Thomson Organization in 1987, it sold off the trade publishing units, including Methuen, to Reed International's Octopus. Reed sold off its trade publishing to Random House in February 1997. Methuen Drama bought itself out in 1998. That same year, Reed sold Methuen's children's catalogue to the Egmont Group.

In 2003, Methuen Drama purchased the company Politico's Publishing from its owner Iain Dale. In 2006, Methuen sold its notable drama lists to A & C Black for £2.35 million.

Penguin Random House now owns the rights to many books that used to be published under the Methuen name via Random House, and the Adrian Mole franchise through Penguin Books. Many of the publisher's academic titles are now published by Routledge.

Methuen continues to publish new works of fiction and non-fiction, as well as reprinting older, classic works. Contemporary Methuen authors include Mark Dunn, Robert McKee, Michael Palin, 1986 Nobel Prize Winner Wole Soyinka, and 2012 Nobel Prize Winner Mo Yan. Classic Methuen authors include the US novelist Walker Percy, the US academic and commentator Neil Postman, and the UK cartoonist Norman Thelwell.

References

Further reading

External links

 Methuen website

Publishing companies established in 1889
Book publishing companies of the United Kingdom
Companies based in York
1889 establishments in England
British companies established in 1889